NGC 3242 (also known as the Ghost of Jupiter, eye nebula or Caldwell 59) is a planetary nebula located  in the constellation Hydra.

William Herschel discovered the nebula on February 7, 1785, and catalogued it as H IV.27. John Herschel observed it from the Cape of Good Hope, South Africa, in the 1830s, and numbered it as h 3248, and included it in the 1864 General Catalogue as GC 2102; this became NGC 3242 in J. L. E. Dreyer's New General Catalogue of 1888.

This planetary nebula is most frequently called the Ghost of Jupiter, or Jupiter's Ghost due to its similar shape to the planet, but it is also sometimes referred to as the Eye Nebula. The nebula measures around two light years long from end to end, and contains a central white dwarf with an apparent magnitude of eleven. The inner layers of the nebula were formed some 1,500 years ago.  The two ends of the nebula are marked by FLIERs, lobes of fast moving gas often tinted red in false-color pictures. NGC 3242 can easily be observed with amateur telescopes and appears bluish-green to most observers. Larger telescopes can distinguish the outer halo as well.

At the center of NGC 3242 is an O-type star with a spectral type of O(H).

Gallery

See also
 List of NGC objects
 Planetary nebula

References

External links

 The Hubble European Space Agency Information Centre  – Hubble picture and information on NGC 3242
 
 NGC3242 on astro-pics.com
 FLIERs in NGC 3242

Planetary nebulae
3242
059b
17850207
Hydra (constellation)